The 1915–16 Luxembourg National Division was the 6th season of top level association football in Luxembourg.

Overview
It was contested by 6 teams, and US Hollerich Bonnevoie won the championship.

League standings

Results

References
Luxembourg - List of final tables (RSSSF)

1915-16
1915–16 in European association football leagues
Nat